Roland is a city in Story County, Iowa, United States. The population was 1,362 at the time of the 2020 census. It is part of the Ames, Iowa Metropolitan Statistical Area, which is a part of the larger Ames-Boone, Iowa Combined Statistical Area.

History
The city was incorporated December 29, 1891.

Geography 
Roland is located at  (42.165662, -93.499965).

Demographics

2010 census
As of the census of 2010, there were 1,284 people, 503 households, and 354 families living in the city. The racial makeup of the city was 98.4% White, 0.2% African American, 0.3% Native American, 0.1% Asian, 0.2% from other races, and 0.8% from two or more races. Hispanic or Latino of any race were 1.0% of the population.

There were 503 households, of which 39.0% had children under the age of 18 living with them, 61.2% were married couples living together, 6.8% had a female householder with no husband present, 2.4% had a male householder with no wife present, and 29.6% were non-families. 26.2% of all households were made up of individuals, and 9.6% had someone living alone who was 65 years of age or older. The average household size was 2.55 and the average family size was 3.10.

The median age in the city was 35.9 years. 28.5% of residents were under the age of 18; 6.2% were between the ages of 18 and 24; 29.4% were from 25 to 44; 25.9% were from 45 to 64; and 10% were 65 years of age or older. The gender makeup of the city was 49.0% male and 51.0% female.

2000 census
As of the census of 2000, there were 1,324 people, 485 households, and 366 families living in the city. The racial makeup of the city was 99.02% White, 0.08% Native American, 0.23% Asian, 0.08% from other races, and 0.60% from two or more races. Hispanic or Latino of any race were 0.68% of the population.

There were 485 households, out of which 41.9% had children under the age of 18 living with them, 66.6% were married couples living together, 6.8% had a female householder with no husband present, and 24.5% were non-families. 22.1% of all households were made up of individuals, and 10.7% had someone living alone who was 65 years of age or older. The average household size was 2.73 and the average family size was 3.22.

32.4% are under the age of 18, 5.1% from 18 to 24, 30.9% from 25 to 44, 20.5% from 45 to 64, and 11.1% who were 65 years of age or older. The median age was 34 years. For every 100 females, there were 95.6 males. For every 100 females age 18 and over, there were 96.3 males.

The median income for a household in the city was $47,461, and the median income for a family was $55,417. Males had a median income of $34,118 versus $27,045 for females. The per capita income for the city was $18,165. About 4.1% of families and 4.3% of the population were below the poverty line, including 5.7% of those under age 18 and 5.9% of those age 65 or over.

Government 
Roland has a mayor-council form of government, with a mayor elected to a two-year term and five city council members elected to 4-year terms.

In November 2005, the citizens of Roland elected Sam Juhl (I) the mayor of the city; Juhl was 18 years old and a high school student at the time of his election, and was sworn into office in January 2006. Juhl was elected to a second term and did not seek a third.

The current mayor is Andrew H. Webb whose term expires on December 31, 2021.

Education
The Roland–Story Community School District operates public schools. The district was established on July 1, 1969, with the merger of the Roland and Story City school districts.

Notable people  

Gary Thompson, basketball player and color commentator

References

External links
 
 City of Roland portal style website City Government, Library, Area Development Corp. and more
 City Data Comprehensive Statistical Data and more about Roland, Iowa

Cities in Story County, Iowa
Cities in Iowa
1891 establishments in Iowa